This is a List of Amarna letters by size, mostly length X width, and starting with the shortest (in Height). Note: a few Amarna letters are wider than tall, for example EA 290.

It should be understood the definition of "mayor" in the Amarna letters. (The definition of King is relatively obvious). Some mayors are called the "Man Town XXX". The obvious description is to call the mayor a governor, (the man who governs, no matter the size of the City-state; ("governor" means "govern-or"). The power of local governors depended on conflicts, or commercial local successes, or of course the discourses, including the everpresent Habiru, ('Apiru).

Amarna letter EA 252

Amarna letter EA 365

Amarna letter EA 15

Amarna letter EA 153

Amarna letter EA 367

Amarna letter EA 364

Amarna letter EA 9

Amarna letter EA 161

Amarna letter EA 38

Amarna letter EA 5

Amarna letter EA 35

Amarna letter EA 26

Amarna letter EA 288

Amarna letter EA 19

Amarna letter EA 27

See also
Amarna letters
British Museum
Louvre
Vorderasiatisches Museum Berlin
Metropolitan Museum of Art

References

External links

Vorderasiatisches Museum image gallery for VAT153, EA 38
British Museum image gallery for E29791, EA 19
CDLI listing of all EA Amarna letters, 1-382. They all can show photos/ or drawings of the individual letter.
High-resolution images, from the Vorderasiatisches Museum Berlin.

Clay tablets
A